Quintanarraya is a town in the province of Burgos in the autonomous community of Castilla y León, Spain.

Located near the ancient Roman city of Clunia, was possession of several monasteries, such as Santo Domingo de Silos, until he escaped with Philip IV of its jurisdiction. It is a place of passage of both the Camino del Cid and the Ruta de la Lana.

Mostly aging population, economic activity is focused on agriculture and livestock. Of all the celebrations that take place throughout the year, highlight the festivities of Saint Roch, in mid-August.

Towns in Spain
Province of Burgos